The steel-blue flycatcher (Myiagra ferrocyanea) is a species of bird in the family Monarchidae.
It is found in Papua New Guinea and Solomon Islands.

Taxonomy and systematics
Alternate names for the steel-blue flycatcher include Solomons flycatcher, Solomons Myiagra flycatcher, Solomons satin flycatcher and steel-blue Myiagra.

Subspecies
Four subspecies are recognized:
 M. f. cinerea - (Mathews, 1928): Found on Bougainville Island and Buka Island
 M. f. ferrocyanea - Ramsay, 1879: Found on Santa Isabel Island, Choiseul Island and Guadalcanal
 M. f. feminina - Rothschild & Hartert, 1901: Originally described as a separate species. Found on New Georgia Islands
 M. f. malaitae - Mayr, 1931: Found on Malaita

References

Myiagra
Birds described in 1879
Taxonomy articles created by Polbot